Beckwith is an unincorporated community in Fayette County, West Virginia, United States. Beckwith had a post office, which closed on October 3, 1998. The community has the name of P. D. Beckwith.

References

Unincorporated communities in Fayette County, West Virginia
Unincorporated communities in West Virginia